Carlo Chiti (19 December 1924 – 7 July 1994) was an Italian racing car and engine designer best known for his long association with Alfa Romeo's racing department. He also worked for Ferrari and was involved in the design of the Ferrari 156 Sharknose car, with which Phil Hill won the 1961 championship.

Early life
Born in Pistoia, Tuscany, Chiti graduated with a degree in aeronautical engineering from the University of Pisa in Italy in 1953.

Motorsport career

Chiti joined Alfa Romeo in 1952 and designed the Alfa Romeo 3000 CM sports car. When Alfa Romeo's competition department was closed down in the late 1950s Chiti was invited to join Scuderia Ferrari.

At Ferrari Chiti was involved with the design of the 1958 championship winning car Ferrari 246 F1 together with Vittorio Jano and the Ferrari 156 Sharknose car, with which Phil Hill won the 1961 championship. He also mentored a new generation of aspiring designers who had begun a period of apprenticeship at the team, including Mauro Forghieri and Gian Paolo Dallara. In 1962, following a disagreement with Enzo Ferrari, Chiti, Giotto Bizzarrini and other senior figures left the company. They were subsequently invited by Giovanni Volpi to join the breakaway ATS Formula One team, who had employed a number of disaffected ex-Ferrari personnel. The ATS project was not successful and did not last long and in 1963 Chiti re-entered competitive motor racing through a new project, Autodelta.

Autodelta enabled Chiti to rekindle his association with Alfa Romeo, for whom he designed a V8 and then a flat-12 engine for their Alfa Romeo Tipo 33 sportscars. These were eventually successful, winning the 1975 World Championship for Makes and 1977 World Championship for Sports Cars. At this time, Chiti became involved in Formula One again, through the Brabham team, who signed an agreement with Alfa Romeo to use Chiti's engines. There was some success – Niki Lauda won two races in a Brabham BT46 with the Alfa engine in the 1978 Formula One season. Brabham designer Gordon Murray persuaded Chiti to produce a V12 engine to allow ground effect to be exploited by the team. However, during the 1979 Formula One season, Brabham's owner Bernie Ecclestone announced that the team would switch to Ford for the next season, prompting Chiti to seek permission from Alfa Romeo to start developing a Formula One car on their behalf. The partnership with Brabham finished before the end of the season.

The Alfa Romeo Formula One project started with some promise but was never able to recapture the glory days of the marque in the 1950s. The team achieved two pole positions, with Bruno Giacomelli leading much of the 1980 United States Grand Prix before retiring with electrical trouble. Tragedy also occurred when Patrick Depailler was killed testing for the 1980 German Grand Prix at the Hockenheimring. The team's best season was 1983, when Chiti designed a turbocharged 890T V8 engine, and Alfa Romeo achieved 6th place in the constructors' championship, largely thanks to two second-place finishes for Andrea de Cesaris.

In 1984 Chiti left Alfa Romeo to set up another company, Motori Moderni which concentrated on producing engines for Formula One. Initially the company produced a V6 turbo design, used briefly by the small Italian Minardi team. However the underfunded operation meant the engines were not competitive. When the banning of turbos from Formula One was announced, Chiti designed a new 3.5 litre atmospheric flat-12 engine. This was eventually taken up by Subaru, who badged it for use in their brief and completely unsuccessful entry into Formula One with the tiny Coloni team in the 1990 Formula One season.

Later life
Carlo Chiti died in 1994 in Milan.

In 1999, Koenigsegg bought blueprints, machining tools and the patent for an unused 4 litre Chiti designed Formula One flat-12 engine.

Notes

Sources
www.grandprix.com
www.gpracing.net192.com
www.historicracing.com
FORIX.com: Grand Prix engine designers

1924 births
1994 deaths
People from Pistoia
Italian automotive engineers
Alfa Romeo people
Formula One designers
Ferrari people
University of Pisa alumni
Italian motorsport people
Formula One team owners